A Christmas Carol is a 2000 British crime fantasy television film, written by Peter Bowker, that first broadcast on ITV on 20 December 2000. The film is a modern adaptation of Charles Dickens' 1843 novella of the same name, and stars Ross Kemp in the role of Eddie Scrooge, who finds himself repeatedly living the same Christmas Eve while he is haunted by ghosts. The story is set nearly entirely on a London housing estate.

The film was one of a number of projects offered to Kemp as part of his "golden handcuffs" deal with ITV, following his departure from EastEnders. 9.41 million viewers watched the film on its debut Wednesday night broadcast. The film is also regularly repeated on ITV3 during the buildup to Christmas each year. The film has never been released on DVD.

Synopsis
Eddie Scrooge is an unscrupulous loan shark living on a poor inner-city estate, who brings misery to everyone who knows him. Jacob Marley, a local criminal and associate of Scrooge is shot dead. On Christmas Eve, Bob Cratchit, one of Scrooge's debtors, assists Scrooge on collecting debts from the estate. Scrooge declines an invitation to Christmas dinner from his nephew Dave, a police officer. That night, Scrooge is visited by the ghost of Marley, who tells him to expect three ghosts.

The first ghost, Scrooge's father, shows him visions of his past, including his troubled upbringing and meeting his now ex-girlfriend Bella, a nurse who splits from Scrooge upon noticing the misery he causes to his debtors. Scrooge rudely dismisses his father and finds the next morning that he is living the same Christmas Eve all over again, and is able to predict the events of the day. Scrooge chooses to change nothing about the day. That night, Marley reappears, standing in for the second ghost, and shows Scrooge visions of the present Christmas, including the festivities of his debtors, who are nonetheless happy. Bob's son, Tim spends the day in hospital suffering from cistic fibrosis. Two teenagers living rough on the estate die from hypothermia, and their ghosts appear before Scrooge and Marley.

Scrooge once again wakes up on Christmas Eve, and half-heartedly attempts to change events to impress Bella. Scrooge finds the sick teenagers and opts to help them. The girl dies regardless because Scrooge chose to look for Bella rather than call an ambulance. Marley returns one last time and convinces Scrooge to confess that he is partially responsible for his murder; Marley was making a move on the territory of a crook named Stiles, whom Scrooge told where to meet Marley. Scrooge concedes that he does not enjoy his life and Marley vanishes.

Attempting to escape the haunting, Scrooge meets the third ghost, a child that Scrooge recognizes but he is not sure where from. It turns out to be his son, Marley Scrooge. Eddie is so happy to have his son. The boy, his son takes Scrooge to the near future, where Tim dies and the Cratchits split apart in grief. Scrooge's belongings are flogged outside his home following his death, which is celebrated by his debtors. Scrooge vows to change his ways if he is allowed to return to the present, which he is. His son agrees. Scrooge saves the sick teenagers, cancels all his debts and anonymously gives his money away to many of those he has wronged, including the Cratchits. He reveals the identity of Marley's killer and spends Christmas with Dave and his family. Scrooge tells Bella about his hauntings and despite her disbelief she takes him back.

Years later, Scrooge and Bella are ice-skating with their son - who appeared to Scrooge as the third ghost.

Cast
 Ross Kemp as Edward "Eddie" Scrooge 
 Warren Mitchell as James Scrooge, Eddie's Dad (the Ghost of Christmas Past)
 Liz Smith as Joyce
 Michael Maloney as Bob Cratchit
 Angeline Ball as Bella
 Ray Fearon as Jacob Marley (the Ghost of Christmas Present)
 Mina Anwar as Julie 
 Lorraine Ashbourne as Sue Cratchit
 Daniel Ainsleigh as Dave (Fred in the original novella)
 Claudie Blakley as Ellie
 Chloe Howman as Jane
 Bill Thomas as Ted
 Ben Tibber as Tiny Tim Cratchit
 Ben Inigo-Jones as Marley Scrooge, Eddie's Son (the Ghost of Christmas Yet to Come)

See also
 Adaptations of A Christmas Carol
 List of Christmas films

External links

References

Films based on A Christmas Carol
Television shows based on A Christmas Carol
British Christmas films
British supernatural television shows
British television films
ITV television dramas
London Weekend Television shows
Television series by ITV Studios
2000 television films
2000 films
Christmas television films
Films directed by Catherine Morshead